Ividella abbotti is a species of sea snail, a marine gastropod mollusk in the family Pyramidellidae, the pyrams and their allies.

Description
The shell grows to a length of 2.6 mm.

Distribution
This species occurs in the following locations:
 Caribbean Sea
 Colombia
 Costa Rica
 Gulf of Mexico
 Mexico
 Panama

References

External links
 To Biodiversity Heritage Library (1 publication)
 To Encyclopedia of Life
 To USNM Invertebrate Zoology Mollusca Collection

Pyramidellidae
Gastropods described in 1958